George M. Rush Stadium formerly Rams Stadium was renamed in 2015 and is a multi-purpose football stadium in San Francisco, California. Located on the campus of City College of San Francisco the stadium has a capacity of 5,000.

Stadium Tenants
Football, as well as track and field, use the Stadium.  A new FieldTurf soccer practice field has been built north of the stadium.

Teams from the Academy of Art University and Lick-Wilmerding High School also lease the field for their use.

References

External links
 CCSF Athletics

American football venues in San Francisco
Athletics (track and field) venues in San Francisco
Sports venues in San Francisco
College football venues
High school football venues in California